This is a list of shopping malls in Maryland.

Allegany County:
Country Club Mall - La Vale

Anne Arundel County:
Arundel Mills - Hanover
Marley Station Mall - Glen Burnie
Westfield Annapolis - Annapolis

Baltimore City:
Harborplace
Mondawmin Mall
Reisterstown Road Plaza
The Rotunda

Baltimore County:
Eastpoint Mall - Dundalk
Security Square Mall - Woodlawn
The Shops at Kenilworth - Towson
Towson Square 
Towson Town Center
White Marsh Mall - White Marsh

Carroll County:
TownMall of Westminster

Charles County:
St. Charles Towne Center - St. Charles (Waldorf)

Frederick County:
Francis Scott Key Mall - Frederick

Harford County:
Harford Mall - Bel Air

Howard County:
The Mall in Columbia - Columbia
Savage Mill - Savage

Montgomery County:
 Clarksburg Premium Outlets
Ellsworth Place - Silver Spring
Lakeforest Mall - Gaithersburg
Westfield Montgomery - Bethesda
Westfield Wheaton - Wheaton

Prince George's County:
Beltway Plaza Mall - Greenbelt
Bowie Town Center - Bowie
The Centre at Forestville - Forestville
The Shops at Iverson - Hillcrest Heights
The Mall at Prince Georges - Hyattsville

Queen Anne's County:
 Queenstown Premium Outlets

Washington County:
Hagerstown Premium Outlets - Hagerstown
Valley Mall - Hagerstown

Wicomico County:
The Centre at Salisbury

Worcester County
 Tanger Outlets Ocean City

External links  
  Maryland Shopping Malls

Maryland
Shopping malls in Maryland
Shopping malls